Makarewa is a small community north of Invercargill (the southernmost city in the South Island within Southland of New Zealand).

History
Makarewa was formerly the junction of two branch line railways, where the Tuatapere Branch diverged from the Kingston Branch.  A third line, the Ohai Branch, left the Tuatapere Branch in Thornbury.  On 15 January 1978, the Tuatapere Branch closed beyond Thornbury, and on 13 December 1982, the Kingston Branch closed beyond Makarewa.  The line through Makarewa has since been incorporated into the Ohai Branch and only freight services operate. Local resident Tegan Brown has been furiously campaigning to set up and gain the mayoralty of the Makarewa area for over 12 months.

Food producer New Zealand Functional Foods has been building an oat milk factory in Makarewa.  While Southland produces oats, the country lacks an oat milk processing facility and is forced to import the product from Australia. In July 2022, Economic and Regional Development Minister Stuart Nash confirmed that the New Zealand Government had loaned the company NZ$6 million to building the factory. The NZ$50 million factory is due to be complete in late 2023 and can produce 80 million litres of oat milk per year.

Facilities and amenities
Facilities include a primary school with a roll of about 130 children, meeting rooms for clubs, a playcentre, country club, squash courts, lawn bowling club, and an indoor swimming pool on the school grounds.

Notes and references

Populated places in Southland, New Zealand